Mithila, also known as Tirhut, Tirabhukti and Mithilanchal is a geographical and cultural region of the Indian subcontinent bounded by the Mahananda River in the east, the Ganges in the south, the Gandaki River in the west and by the foothills of the Himalayas in the north. It comprises certain parts of Bihar and Jharkhand of India and adjoining districts of the Province No. 1, Bagmati Pradesh and Madhesh Province of Nepal. The native language in Mithila is Maithili, and its speakers are referred to as Maithils.

The name Mithila is commonly used to refer to the Videha Kingdom, as well as to the modern-day territories that fall within the ancient boundaries of Videha. Till the 20th century, Mithila was still ruled in part by the Raj Darbhanga.

History

Vedic period
Mithila first gained prominence after being settled by Indo-Aryan peoples who established the Videha kingdom. During the Later Vedic period (c. 1100–500 BCE), Videha became one of the major political and cultural centers of Ancient India, along with Kuru and Panchala. The kings of the Videha Kingdom were called Janakas. The Videha Kingdom was later incorporated into the Vajjika League, which had its capital in the city of Vaishali, which is also in Mithila.

Medieval period

From the 11th century to the 20th century, Mithila was ruled by various indigenous dynasties. The first of these were the Karnatas, the Oiniwar Dynasty and the Khandwala Dynasty also known as Raj Darbhanga. The Malla dynasty and Licchavi dynasty of Nepal were also Maithil in origin. The rulers of the Oiniwar Dynasty and the Raj Darbhanga were Maithil Brahmins. It was during the reign of the Raj Darbhanga family that the capital of Mithila was shifted to Darbhanga.

Tughlaq had attacked and taken control of Bihar, and from the end of the Tughlaq Dynasty until the establishment of the Mughal Empire in 1526, there was anarchy and chaos in the region. Akbar (reigned from 1556 to 1605) realised that taxes from Mithila could only be collected if there was a king who could ensure peace there. The Brahmins were dominant in the Mithila region and Mithila had Brahmin kings in the past.

Akbar summoned Rajpandit Chandrapati Thakur to Delhi and asked him to name one of his sons who could be made caretaker and tax collector for his lands in Mithila. Chandrapati Thakur named his middle son, Mahesh Thakur, and Akbar declared Mahesh Thakur as the caretaker of Mithila on the day of Ram Navami in 1557 AD.

Lakshmeshwar Singh (reigned from 1860 to 1898) was the eldest son of Maharaja Maheshwar Singh of Darbhanga.  He, along with his younger brother, Rameshwar Singh received a western education from Government appointed tutors as well as a traditional Indian education from a Sanskrit Pandit. He spent approximately £300,000 on relief work during the Bihar famine of 1873–74. He constructed hundreds of miles of roads in various parts of the Raj, planting them with tens of thousands of trees for the comfort of travellers, as part of generating employment for people effected by famine. He constructed iron bridges over all the navigable rivers

He built, and entirely supported, a first-class Dispensary at Darbhanga, which cost £3400; a similar one at Kharakpur, which cost £3500; and largely contributed to many others.

He built an Anglo-vernacular school at a cost of £1490, which he maintained, as well as nearly 30 vernacular schools of different grades; and subsidised a much larger number of educational institutions. He was also one of the founders of Indian National Congress as well as one of the main financial contributors thereto. Maharaja Lakshmeshwar Singh is known for purchasing Lowhter Castle for the venue of the 1888 Allahabad Congress session when the British denied permission to use any public place. The British Governor[who?] commissioned Edward Onslow Ford to make a statue of Lakshmeshwar Singh. This is installed at Dalhousie Square in Kolkata.

On the occasion of the Jubilee of the reign of Queen Victoria, Lakshmeshwar Singh was declared as a Knight Commander of the Most Eminent Order of the Indian Empire, and was promoted to Knight Grand Commander in 1897.
He was also a member of the Royal Commission on Opium of 1895, formed by British Government along with Haridas Viharidas Desai who was the Diwan of Junagadh. The Royal Opium Commission consisted of a 9-member team of which 7 were British and 2 were Indians and its chairman was Earl Brassey.

Geography

Mithila is a distinct geographical region with natural boundaries like rivers and hills. It is largely a flat and fertile alluvial plain criss-crossed by numerous rivers which originate from the Himalayas. Due to the flat plains and fertile land Mithila has a rich variety of biotic resources; however, because of frequent floods people could not take full advantage of these resources.

Seven major rivers flow through Mithila:  Gandak, Kosi, Mahananda, Bagmati, Kamala, Balan, and the Budhi Gandak. They flow from the Himalayas in the north to the Ganges river in the south. These rivers regularly flood, depositing silt onto the farmlands and sometimes causing death or hardship.

Culture

Men and women in Mithila are very religious and dress  for the festivals as well.The costumes of Mithila stem from the rich traditional culture of Mithila. Panjabi Kurta and Dhoti with a Mithila Painting bordered  Maroon coloured Gamchha which is the Symbol of Passion, Love, Bravery and Courage are common clothing items for men. Men wear Gold ring in their nose which symbolizes prosperity, happiness and wealth inspired by Lord Vishnu. Also wear Balla on their wrist and Mithila Paag on their Head. In ancient times there was no colour option in Mithila, so the Maithil women wore white or yellow Saree with red Border but now they have a lot of variety and colour options and wear Laal-Paara (the traditional red-boarded white or yellow Saree) on some special occasions, and also wear Shakha-Pola  with lahthi in their hand. In Mithila culture, this represents new beginnings, passion and prosperity. Red also represents the Hindu goddess Durga, a symbol of new beginnings and feminine power. During Chhaith, the women of Mithila wear pure cotton dhoti without stitching which reflects the pure, traditional Culture of Mithila. Usually crafted from pure cotton for daily use and from pure silk for more glamorous occasions, traditional attire for the women of Mithila includes Jamdani, Banarisi and Bhagalpuri and many more. Jhijhiya and Dhuno-Naach are the Cultural Dance of Mithila. Jhijhiya is performed in Darbhanga, Muzaffarpur, Madhubani and their Neighbour Districts on the other hand Dhuno-Naach is performed in Begusarai, Khagaria, Katihar, Naugachia during Durga Puja and Kalipuja with Shankha-Dhaak Sound.
Many festivals are celebrated throughout the year in Mithila. Chhaith, Durga Puja and Kali puja is celebrated as perhaps the most important of all the celebrations of Mithila.

Mithila Paag

The Paag is a headdress in the Mithila region of India and Nepal worn by Maithil people. It is a symbol of honour and respect and a significant part of Maithil culture.

The Paag dates back to pre-historic times when it was made of plant leaves. It exists today in a modified form. The Paag is wore by the whole Maithil community. The colour of the Paag also carries a lot of significance. The red Paag is worn by the bridegroom and by those who are undergoing the sacred thread rituals. Paag of mustard colour is donned by those attending wedding ceremonies and the elders wear a white Paag.

This Paag now features place in the popular Macmillan Dictionary. For now, Macmillan Dictionary explains Paag as “a kind of headwear worn by people in the Mithila belt of India.”

On 10 February 2017, India Posts released a set of sixteen commemorative postage stamps on "Headgears of India". The Mithila Paag was featured on one of those postage stamps.

Language

People of Mithila region speak Maithili primarily and are well versed in other languages like English, Hindi and Nepali for other different purposes.

This language is an Indo-Aryan language native to the Indian subcontinent, mainly spoken in India and Nepal and is one of the 22 recognised Indian languages. In Nepal, it is spoken in the eastern Terai and is the second most prevalent language of Nepal. Tirhuta is formerly the primary script for written Maithili. Less commonly, it was also written in the local variant of Kaithi. Today it is written in the Devanagari adopted script.

Maithil Cuisine

Maithil cuisine is a part of Indian cuisine and Nepalese cuisine. It is a culinary style which originated in Mithila. Some traditional Maithil dishes are:
 Dahi-Chura
 Vegetable of Arikanchan
 Ghooghni
 Traditional Pickles, made of fruits and vegetables which are generally mixed with ingredients like salt, spices, and vegetable oils and are set to mature in a moistureless medium.
 Tarua of Tilkor
 Bada
 Badee
 Yogurt 
 Maachh
 Mutton
 Irhar
 Purakiya ( also known as Gujia) which is basically dumplings.
 Makhan Payas
 Anarasa
 Bagiya

Madhubani/Mithila Painting

Madhubani art or Mithila painting is practiced in the Mithila region of India and Nepal.
It was traditionally created by the women of different communities of the Mithila region. It is named after Madhubani district of Bihar, India which is where it originated. 

This painting as a form of wall art was practiced widely throughout the region; the more recent development of painting on paper and canvas originated among the villages around Madhubani, and it is these latter developments that may correctly be referred to as Madhubani art.

Main festivals 
 Chhaith: Prayers during Chhath puja are dedicated to the solar deity, Surya, to show gratitude and thankfulness
 Saama-Chakeba: includes folk theater and song, celebrates the love between brothers and sisters and is based on a legend recounted in the Puranas.
 Aghaniya Chhaith (Chhotka Pabni): Very popular with the name of "Chhotka-Pabni" and Dopaharka Aragh in Mithila.Celebrated in Aghan Shukla-paksha Shasthi tithi.
 Baisakkha Chhaith (Chhotka Pabni): This is celebrated in month of Baishakh Shukla-paksha Shasthi tithi and It is also called Chhotka-Pabni(Dopaharka Aragh) in Mithila.
 Chaurchan: Along with Lord Ganesha, Lord Vishnu, Goddess Parvati and the moon god is worshipped. The story of Chorchan Puja is also heard on this day after that arghya is offered to the moon god (Chandra Deva).
 Jitiya: celebrated mainly in Indian states of Bihar, Jharkhand and Uttar Pradesh and Nepal; mothers fast (without water) for wellbeing of their children.
 Vivaha Panchami: Hindu festival celebrating the wedding of Rama and Sita. It is observed on the fifth day of the Shukla paksha or waxing phase of moon in the Agrahayana month (November – December) as per Maithili calendar and in the month of Margashirsha in the Hindu calendar. 
 Sita Navami
 Ganga Dussehra: Ganga Dussehra, also known as Gangavataran, is a Hindu festival celebrated by Maithils in Mokshdhaam Simaria Dhaam (The Welcome Gate of Mithila). avatarana (descent) of the Ganges. It is believed by Hindus that the holy river Ganges descended from heaven to earth on this day. 
 Kalpwas: Celebrated in Every Kartik Month in Simaria Dhaam, Begushorai.
 Kojagiri (Lachhmi Puja): harvest festival marking the end of monsoon season 
 Paata Puja (Durga Maay Aagmon)
 Khutti Puja (Ritual of Durga Puja)
 Mohalaya 
 Durga Puja: a ten-day festival, of which the last five are of the most significance. is an important festival in the Shaktism tradition of Hinduism. It marks the victory of goddess Durga in her battle against the shape-shifting asura, Mahishasura. Thus, the festival epitomizes the victory of good over evil, though it is also in part a harvest festival celebrating the goddess as the motherly power behind all of life and creation.
 Kali Puja: dedicated to the Hindu goddess Kali, celebrated on the new moon day Dipannita Amavasya of the Hindu month Kartik
 Saraswati Puja: marks the preparation for the arrival of spring. The festival is celebrated by people of Dharmic religions in the South Asian countries in different ways depending on the region. Vasant Panchami also marks the start of preparation for Holika and Holi, which take place forty days later. 
 Rama Navami: celebrates the descent of Vishnu as the Rama avatar, through his birth to King Dasharatha and Queen Kausalya in Ayodhya, Kosala. 
 Basanti Puja (Chaiti Durga Puja)
 Til Sakraait
 Aakhar Bochhor
 Pahun Shashthi
 Naag Panchami
 Barsaait
 Vishwakarma Puja
 Holi
 Ghadi Paabain

People
Maithili language speakers are referred to as Maithils and they are an Indo-Aryan ethno-linguistic group. There are an estimated 75 million Maithils in India alone. The vast majority of them are Hindu.

The people of Mithila can be split into various caste/clan affiliations such as Brahmins, Kayasthas, Kewats, Bhumihars, Rajputs, Koeris, Baniyas, Kamatas, Ahirs, Kurmis, Dushads, Koeris, Kujras, Manush and many more.

Notable people 
 
The following are notable residents (past and present) of Mithila region.

 Aeneas Lionel Acton Mackintosh, was a British Merchant Navy officer and Antarctic explorer, who commanded the Ross Sea party as part of Sir Ernest Shackleton's, 1914-17 Imperial Trans-Antarctic Expedition.
 Maghfoor Ahmad Ajazi, Indian Freedom fighter, political activist, social worker, poet and writer, born in Muzaffarpur
 Bimalendra Nidhi, Member of Nepalese parliament, Vice president of ruling party Nepali Congress and former Deputy Prime Minister of Nepal.
Ramdhari Singh 'Dinkar' was an Indian Hindi poet, essayist, patriot and academic.
 Bindheshwari Prasad Mandal was an Indian parliamentarian and social reformer who served as the chairman of the Second Backward Classes Commission (popularly known as the Mandal Commission).
 C. K. Raut, formerly US-based computer scientist, author and political leader of Nepal.
 C. K. Lal, Nepalese journalist and writer from Mahottari District of Nepal.
 Phanishwar Nath 'Renu', influential writer of modern Hindi literature in the post-Premchand era.
 Gopal Jee Thakur, Indian Politician and Member of Parliament from Darbhanga Lok Sabha Constituency.
 Syed Shahnawaz Hussain, Indian politician, born in Supaul
 Janaka, King of Mithila and Father in Law of King Rama
 Sita, Princess of Mithila Kingdom and wife of King Rama
 Bhagwat Jha Azad was the Chief Minister of Bihar and a member of Lok Sabha.
 Maithili Thakur, Indian singer
 Ram Baran Yadav, First president of Nepal
 Sharda Sinha, Indian folk singer
 Udit Narayan, Bollywood playback singer
 Kanhaiya Kumar, leader of Congress
 Narendra Jha, Bollywood actor
 Harisimhadeva, King of Mithila during the Karnat dynasty
 Sriti Jha, Indian television actress
 Kirti Azad, former Indian cricketer and politician
 Vidyapati, Maithili poet and a Sanskrit writer and a Polyglot
 Sanjay Mishra, Bollywood actor
 Bhawana Kanth, one of the first female fighter pilots of India
 Gangesha Upadhyaya, 12th-century Indian mathematician and philosopher
 Vikas Kumar Jha
 George Orwell, novelist and essayist, journalist and critic 
 Rambriksh Benipuri, Indian freedom fighter, Socialist Leader, editor and Hindi writer
 Devaki Nandan Khatri, Indian writer
 Ganganath Jha, Indian scholar
 Ramjee Singh, former Member of Indian parliament and vice-chancellor of Jain Vishva Bharati University
 Acharya Ramlochan Saran, Hindi literature, grammarian and publisher
 Ramesh Chandra Jha, Indian poet, novelist and freedom fighter
 Binod Bihari Verma, Indian army man and poet
 Acharya Rameshwar Jha, scholar 
 Phanishwar Nath 'Renu', Indian author 
 Ravindra Prabhat a Hindi novelist, journalist, poet, and short story writer
 Gajendra Thakur, Literary critic, historian, novelist, dramatist, poet, and a lexicographer
 Anerood Jugnauth, former President of Mauritius
 Parmanand Jha, first vice-president of Nepal
 Dhirendra Premarshi, presenter of Hello Mithila on Radio Kantipur
 Godawari Dutta, madhubani artist, social activist
 Tarkishore Prasad, Deputy Chief Minister of Bihar, born in Saharsa district
 Ramnath Goenka, Indian journalist, born in Darbhanga

Demands for administrative units

Proposed Indian state

There is an ongoing movement in the Maithili speaking region of Bihar and Jharkhand for a separate Indian state of Mithila.

Proposed Nepalese province

There was a movement in the Maithili speaking areas of Nepal for a separate province. Province No. 2 was established under the 2015 Constitution, which transformed Nepal into a Federal Democratic Republic, with a total of 7 provinces. Province No. 2 has a substantial Maithili speaking population and consists most of the Maithili speaking areas of Nepal. It was demanded by some Mithila activists that Province No. 2 be named 'Mithila Province'.
On 23 December 2021, four different names for the Province No. 2 were presented by the various parties of the Provincial Assembly of Madhesh Province. The four names were ‘Madhesh Pradesh’, ‘Janaki Pradesh’, ‘Madhya Madhesh Pradesh’ and ‘Mithila Bhojpura’.

Among the four names, Madhesh Pradesh (Madhesh Province) was chosen and finalized on 17 January 2022. The name was finalized with 80 percent majority in the Provincial Assembly. Janakpur was named as the capital of the province.

See also

Mithila (proposed Indian state)
Mithila Painting
Mithila Makhana
Mithilā (ancient city)
Jhijhiya
Mithila Student Union
Maithili duck

Notes

References

Bibliography

External links

 The Maithil Brahmans - an online ethnography

.
Regions of Bihar
Regions of Nepal
Historical Indian regions
Cultural regions
.01
.01
.01